Samarino is a rural locality (a selo) in Blagovarsky Selsoviet, Blagovarsky District, Bashkortostan, Russia. The population was 285 as of 2010. There are 2 streets.

Geography 
Samarino is located 9 km southwest of Yazykovo (the district's administrative centre) by road. Kirillo-Karmasan is the nearest rural locality.

References 

Rural localities in Blagovarsky District